Leopold Hirsch (1857–1932) was a German-born financier and art collector in London.

Life 
Hirsch was born at Heppenheim, Germany, in 1857 to German Jewish parents, Baruch and Nina Hirsch. Shortly after leaving Germany and arriving in London, Hirsch was employed as a broker by Sir Julius Wernher. He arrived in London with only £5 and had made a fortune by his death in 1932. 

As a successful financier and art collector, he became part of the British establishment. He lived at Kensington Palace Gardens in central London. His funeral was held at the Jewish Cemetery, Willesden.

References 
"Fortune Built on £5: Romance of Great Rand Boom: Mr Leopold Hirsch Dead". The Daily Telegraph. 14 September 1932. p 11.
"Eclectic Collector". The Daily Telegraph. 15 September 1932. p 10.
"Mr. Leopold Hirsch" (1932) 175 South Africa 371 (16 September 1932)
"Mr. Leopold Hirsch's Estate". The Guardian. 11 January 1933. p 11.
"Diamond Romance". Star. 25 February 1933. Supplement. p 22. (Christchurch).
"Money Matters" (1895) 80 The Saturday Review 505. See also p 763.
Kubicek. Economic Imperialism in Theory and Practice. 1979. pp 98 & 183.
(1956) 18 Jewish Social Studies 280
"The Development of Armageddon" (1915) 65 The National Review 561
Rebecca West. A Train of Powder. Viking Press. 1955. p 301.
(1971) 150 Country Life 1363 (18 November 1971)
"Kensington Palace Gardens" (1972) 37 Survey of London 165
"The Leopold Hirsch Collection to come under the Hammer" (1934) 184 The Illustrated London News 132 (27 January 1934)
Evans. Utmost Fidelity. Sansom. 2009. pp 56 & 64.

1857 births
1932 deaths
Businesspeople from Darmstadt
German Jews
British people of German-Jewish descent
British financiers
British bankers
German art collectors